Jacob (Jaap) van Praag (10 July 1910 – 7 August 1987) was a Dutch football administrator and chairman for local football club Ajax Amsterdam.

Early life
Jaap van Praag began his professional career working in the musical business of his father in Amsterdam, where he was born. Unlike his father, he saw great potential in the gramophone record and started his own business on the Spui downtown, called His Master's Voice. He was forced into hiding due to the persecution of Jews during World War II where he first found refuge staying with the uncle of former Ajax player Wim Schoevaart. He was forced to sit still in a chair, motionless, and not move, because the owner of the store did not even know he was there. His first wife during this time was not Jewish and did not go into hiding with him, and left him for another man during this period.

The parents of Jaap van Praag and his sister were murdered in Auschwitz.

After the war, he remained an active businessman in the music world. He was also active in television, and in 1962 he hosted the game show Onbekend Talent (Unknown Talent) for the VARA, which was one of the first programs that gave young talent a chance on television.

Career
In 1964, Jaap van Praag became chairman of the Dutch Association football club AFC Ajax, and the club's golden age began. The club had just narrowly escaped relegation the previous season, so Jaap van Praag decided to hire former Ajax attacker Rinus Michels as the new head coach. Together they took the club to new professional heights, with the financial help of Maup Caransa and the Van der Meijden brothers amongst others. The Van der Meijden brothers were known to have collaborated with the Nazis during World War II, and are widely known as the bunkerbouwers (bunker builders). Jaap van Praag was legendary and admitted that he never had a difficulty lying if it was ever in the interest of his club. Famous in this respect is the statement by Johan Cruyff on Jaap van Praag, stating that he was never able to catch him in a truth. Under the guidance of Van Praag, Ajax won the European Cup three times in a row from 1971 to 1973. In 1987 Jaap van Praag died at age 77 in a traffic accident in his hometown of Amsterdam. Cees van Cuilenborg, the then C.E.O. of Voetbal International, described the life of Jaap van Praag in his obituary as a life with a smile .

Family 
Jaap van Praag had four children from two marriages. From his second marriage he had a daughter named Peggy and a son named Michael. His son Michael van Praag would later follow in his fathers footsteps and was also chairman of AFC Ajax during another very successful period at the club. His son served this function from 1989 to 2003. From his third marriage he had two daughters, Pamela and the TV host and Actor Beryl van Praag.

The newsreader Marga van Praag and Television presenter Chiel van Praag are his children, and Jaap van Praag is their uncle.

Name confusion 
There is another Jaap van Praag, his namesake, a politician with whom he is often confused. Both were around the same age (born 1910 and 1911), both born in Amsterdam and both survived the war hiding in the city. In addition both played a role in broadcasting for the VARA.

See also
AFC Ajax
History of AFC Ajax
Marga van Praag
Michael van Praag

Bibliography
 :nl: Simon Kuper, Ajax, the Dutch, the War: The Strange Tale of Soccer During Europe's Darkest Hour, Nation Books, New York, 2012, 
 :nl: Marga van Praag and :nl: Ad van Liempt, Jaap en Max: het verhaal van de broers Van Praag, Nijgh & Van Ditmar, Rotterdam, 2011,

References

External links

 Photo collection » Ajax-chairman Jaap van Praag at GaHetNa.nl

1910 births
1987 deaths
AFC Ajax chairmen and investors
Members of the UEFA Executive Committee
Dutch Jews
Dutch sports executives and administrators
Jewish Dutch sportspeople
Sportspeople from Amsterdam
Sports businesspeople
Road incident deaths in the Netherlands
20th-century Dutch people